Miroslav Kultyshev (born August 21, 1985) is a Russian classical pianist and was awarded second prize at the 2007 International Tchaikovsky Competition (no first prize was awarded).

Biography

Early life and education
Kultyshev was born in Saint Petersburg, Russia (then Leningrad, Soviet Union), on August 21, 1985. He gave his first concert at age six, and at age ten, he appeared in the Grand Hall of the St. Petersburg Philharmonic, performing Mozart's D minor Concerto No. 20, K466 under the direction of Yuri Temirkanov.

In 2004, Kultyshev graduated from the Secondary Specialized Musical School of the St. Petersburg State Conservatory, where he studied under Zora Zucker.

He is currently a student at the St. Petersburg Conservatory, where he studies with Alexander Sandler.

Career
In 1996, he made his debut with the Saint Petersburg Philharmonic Orchestra.

Since 2006, he has been a scholar and active participant of the St. Petersburg House of Music. He tours in Austria, Germany, France, Italy, Great Britain, the United States, the Netherlands, Czech Republic, Slovakia, Lithuania, United Arab Emirates, and Ukraine.

From 2006 until 2007, he took part in an internship at the International Holland Music Sessions.

In 2007, he won the 13th International Tchaikovsky Competition in Moscow, Russia, being awarded second prize - no first prize was awarded that year.

He has released an album which includes his performance of all twelve of Franz Liszt's Études d'exécution transcendante. He holds scholarships from the Yuri Bashmet Foundation and the St. Petersburg Philharmonic Society. He regularly tours with the conductor Valery Gergiev. He has also worked with conductors Vladimir Ashkenazy, Constantine Orbelian, Yuri Bashmet, and Vassily Sinaisky.

Awards
1998: G. Neuhaus International Festival
1999: International Music Festival “Virtuosos of 2000”
2001: grant-holder of the National Youth Prize “Triumph”.
2005: First prize and Golden Medal of the International Youth Delphic Games (Ukraine, Kiev)
2007: silver medal, 13th International Tchaikovsky Competition
2010: Distinction in XVI International Chopin Piano Competition
2012: Monte Carlo Piano Masters

References

1985 births
Living people
Russian classical pianists
Male classical pianists
Prize-winners of the International Tchaikovsky Competition